Inza may refer to:
a drug with the active ingredient naproxen
Inza, Russia, a town in Ulyanovsk Oblast, Russia
Inza, Cauca, town in Colombia
Inza Nelson, wife of Doctor Fate in DC Comics